Mike Woodard may refer to

Mike Woodard (baseball)
Mike Woodard (politician)